İzmit İsmetpaşa Stadium was a multi-purpose stadium in the Derince district of İzmit in Kocaeli Province, Turkey. It was named after the Turkish general and statesman İsmet İnönü (1884–1973), widely known as İsmet Pasha.

Built in 1972, it was situated on the Istanbul-İzmit highway . The stadium held 15,462 spectators, and was primarily used for football matches as the home stadium of Kocaelispor.

Demolition
In 2013, it was announced that the stadium's estate was handed over to Public Works and the stadium will be demolished in order to make place for residences and a shopping mall. A new stadium, İzmit Stadium, with 33,000 seating capacity was built in Alikahya neighborhood of Kartepe district. The demolition works are scheduled to start in June 2015.

References

External links
Venue information

Football venues in Turkey
Kocaelispor
Multi-purpose stadiums in Turkey
Sports venues in İzmit